
Gmina Tykocin is an urban-rural gmina (administrative district) in Białystok County, Podlaskie Voivodeship, in north-eastern Poland.

Villages
Apart from the town of Tykocin, Gmina Tykocin contains the villages and settlements of Bagienki, Broniszewo, Dobki, Hermany, Janin, Kapice-Lipniki, Kiermusy, Kiślaki, Krosno, Łaziuki, Łazy Duże, Łazy Małe, Leśniki, Lipniki, Łopuchowo, Nieciece, Nowe Jeżewo, Pajewo, Piaski, Popowlany, Radule, Rzędziany, Sanniki, Sawino, Siekierki, Sierki, Słomianka, Stare Jeżewo, Stare Kapice, Stelmachowo, Stelmachowo-Kolonia, Szafranki, Tatary and Żuki.

Neighbouring gminas
Gmina Tykocin is bordered by the gminas of Choroszcz, Dobrzyniewo Duże, Kobylin-Borzymy, Krypno, Trzcianne and Zawady.

References
Polish official population figures 2006

Tykocin
Białystok County